Michael L. Covone (born August 31, 1969 in Hialeah, Florida) is a retired American soccer forward who is the Director of Athletics for Barry University. Covone played professionally in the Major Indoor Soccer League and coached the Barry University women's soccer team from 1984 to 1994, winning three NCAA Division II national championships.

Player
Covone, brother of Neil Covone, graduated from Hialeah-Miami Lakes High School. He attended Miami Dade North, playing on the men's soccer team in 1988 and 1989. He played professionally for one season with the Phoenix Inferno of the Major Indoor Soccer League.

Coach
In 1983, Covone served as an assistant with the Miami Dade South men's soccer team which took the 1983 NJCAA national championship. In 1984, he moved to Barry University to become the school's first women's soccer coach. He held that position until 1994, compiling a 140-32-9 record. Barry won the 1989, 1992 and 1993 NCAA Division II national championships, finishing runner-up in 1988 and 1995.

Executive
In 1988, Covone became the Barry University Director of Athletics. He has held numerous other executive positions, including chairman of the Intercollegiate Soccer Association of America, a member of the National Collegiate Athletic Association Management Council (2002-2008) and the NCAA Budget & Finance Committee. He is a member of the Orange Bowl Committee and the National Football League Super Bowl Host Committee.

In 1991, Covone also served as his brother's player agent when Neil signed with the Fort Lauderdale Strikers.

References

External links
 MISL stats
 Barry University: Michael Covone

1969 births
Living people
American soccer coaches
American soccer players
American sports agents
Barry Buccaneers athletic directors
Major Indoor Soccer League (1978–1992) players
Phoenix Inferno players
People from Hialeah, Florida
Association football forwards